Ole Jensen may be:
Ole Jensen (Norwegian sport shooter), competed in team rifle at the 1912 Summer Olympics
Ole Hviid Jensen, Danish sport shooter at the 1956, 1964 and the 1968 Summer Olympics
Ole David Jensen, Danish Olympic racewalker
Ole Jensen (neuroscientist), Danish researcher